Ten Years Old is a 1927 American short silent comedy film directed by Anthony Mack. It was the 58th Our Gang short subject released. It was remade as Birthday Blues in 1932.

Cast

The Gang
 Joe Cobb as Joe
 Jackie Condon as Jackie
 Allen Hoskins as Farina
 Jannie Hoskins as Mango
 Scooter Lowry as Skooter
 Jay R. Smith as Jay-R.
 Bobby Young as Bone Dust
 Mildred Kornman as Mildred
 Johnny Aber as Our Gang member
 Bret Black as Our Gang member
 Jimsy Boudwin as Our Gang member
 Andy Shuford as Our Gang member
 Pal the Dog as himself
 Buster the Dog as himself

Additional cast
 Carl Busch as Rich kid
 Jean Darling as Rich kid
 Bobby Mallon as Rich kid
 Doris Oelze as Rich kid
 George B. French as Jackie's father
 F. F. Guenste as Butler
 Fay Holderness as Jackie's maid
 Lyle Tayo as Joe's mother
 Peggy Eames as Undetermined role

See also
 Our Gang filmography

References

External links

1927 films
1927 comedy films
1927 short films
American silent short films
American black-and-white films
Films directed by Robert A. McGowan
Hal Roach Studios short films
Our Gang films
1920s American films
Silent American comedy films
1920s English-language films